Dominic Lyne (born 1983) is an English author, currently based in London. Common themes within his work include drug abuse, dissociation, sexuality, and mental health issues.

Work
Lyne was born in Canvey Island, Essex.

Common themes within his work include drug abuse, dissociation, sexuality, and mental health issues. Influenced by authors such as Dennis Cooper, Bret Easton Ellis, Chuck Palahniuk, and William S. Burroughs, his body of work aims to create conversations about what is considered to be the darker sides of humanity and society, such as addiction and psychosis. His Cycle-2 series charts the beginnings of his journey through the mental health system through a collection of illustrated shorts and diary entries.

Bibliography

Prose
 A Boy David: Weg von den Wolfen (1999)
 A Boy David: Pause for Thought (2000)
 The Mushroom Diaries (2009)
 Ink Spills and Five Notes of Suicide (2010)
 Best Friends Forever (2011) – with Jeff Michalik
 Thoughts of Discord (2012)
 Transmissions (2012)
 And Mother's Eyes Will Bleed (2013)
 The Heart of Darkness (2014)
 In Dreams We Sleep (2020)

Poetry
 Visions of Wormwood (2012)
 Lullabies for Salvation (2012)
 The Voice that Betrayed (2014)
 Into the Mind of Whoredom (2016)

Cycle-2 Series
 Paradise is Nowhere (2011)
 Lying Wasted Under a Broken Coda (2011)
 The Silent Scream (2012)
 Screams of Silence (2012)

References

External links
 

1983 births
Living people
21st-century English novelists
Mental health in fiction
English male novelists
People from Canvey Island
21st-century English male writers